Mount Jiracek  is a mountain,  high, rising at the west side of the head of Tinker Glacier, in the Southern Cross Mountains of Victoria Land, Antarctica. It was mapped by the United States Geological Survey from surveys and U.S. Navy air photos, 1960–64, and was named by the Advisory Committee on Antarctic Names for George R. Jiracek, a geophysicist at McMurdo Station in 1964–65.

References

Mountains of Victoria Land
Borchgrevink Coast